The 2021 Cornwall-Meadowbank provincial by-election was held on November 15, 2021, to elect a Member of the Legislative Assembly of Prince Edward Island for the district of Cornwall-Meadowbank. The seat became vacant upon the resignation of Liberal MLA Heath MacDonald on August 18, 2021. MacDonald had held the seat since 2015 but resigned to run for Member of Parliament in the 2021 Canadian federal election in Malpeque, which he was successful.

Mark McLane of the governing s won the seat, defeating Liberal Jane MacIsaac. It was the first time the Tories won the area in 36 years. The Tories increased their seat total in the 27 seat legislature to 15.

Candidates 
Musician and activist Todd MacLean ran unopposed for the Green Party nomination, and was acclaimed on October 4.

The Progressive Conservatives nominated businessman Marc McLane at a meeting on October 18. Party president Charles Blue had indicated that several potential candidates were interested in the nomination, however McLane ran unopposed.

On October 20, both the Liberals and New Democrats announced candidates. Businesswoman Jane MacIsaac won the Liberal nomination from a field of four candidates (including future leader Sharon Cameron), and biology professor Larry Hale was acclaimed for the New Democrats.

The deadline for candidate nominations is October 29. The advance poll voter turnout was 32.8%, and the full results were to be ready by November 15.

Results

References 

Cornwall-Meadowbank provincial by-election
Cornwall-Meadowbank provincial by-election
Provincial by-elections in Prince Edward Island